Herbert Whitfield may refer to:
 Herbert Whitfeld (1858–1909), English amateur sportsman who played football and cricket
 Sir Herbert Whitfield (1617–1677), English lawyer and landowner